Valmiki Choudhary (26 July 1921 – 28 March 1996) was an Indian politician. He was elected to the Lok Sabha, the lower house of the Parliament of India from the Hajipur in Bihar as a member of the Indian National Congress.

Choudhary died on 28 March 1996, at the age of 74. MPs paid tribute to him on 10 June.

References

External links
Official biographical sketch in Lok Sabha website

1921 births
1996 deaths
India MPs 1967–1970
Indian National Congress politicians
Lok Sabha members from Bihar